Nights Like This is the third studio album by American singer Stacey Q, released on June 8, 1989 by Atlantic Records. It was her last album to be released on the Atlantic label before she went on a hiatus from making music until the release of her album Boomerang (1997). After the moderate commercial success of her album Hard Machine (1988), Swain decided to pursue a new musical direction. She again worked with Jon St. James but also invited other producers, such as Clivillés & Cole, Robert Gordon or Bruce Gaitsch, to achieve a different sound. Nights Like This is predominantly influenced by freestyle and house music, making it a musical departure from her previous work. The album is, like her album Hard Machine, dedicated to her friend and hair stylist, Danny Medellin, who died in 1988.

Upon its release, Nights Like This received generally positive reviews from music critics, but was a commercial failure. It became her first album not to reach the Billboard 200.

Two singles were released from the album. The lead single, "Give You All My Love", peaked at number sixteen on the Billboard Hot Dance Club Songs and number eight on the Singles Sales chart. Accompanying music videos were released for both, the album version and the Crossover House Mix of the song. "Heartbeat" was released as the second single and it became a minor adult contemporary format radio hit.

Singles
"Give You All My Love" was released as the lead single from the album on May 25, 1989. The music video was shot in Los Angeles, California. It features Swain dancing with her friends inside a loft apartment. One of the dancers is Michael Chambers.

Critical reception

Upon its release, Nights Like This received generally positive reviews from music critics, mostly praising its dance club sound. Justin Kantor at AllMusic gave it two and a half star out of five, calling the songs on the album "more trend-setting than trend-conscious" and recommending it to "club-goers looking for a rhythmically consistent album with just a touch of a pop sensibility."

Track listing

Credits and personnel

 Stacey Swain – lead and backing vocals
 Roger Behle, Jr. – guitars
 Robert Clivillés – producer
 David Cole – producer
 Michael Eckhart – producer, keyboards, programming, backing vocals
 Bruce Gaitsch – producer, guitars, keyboards, engineer
 Mark Gamble – producer
 Sam Lister
 Jon St. James – producer, backing vocals
 David Williams – producer
 Jocelyn Brown – backing vocals
 David Cordrey – backing vocals
 Craig Derry – backing vocals
 Ruth Joy – backing vocals
 Ed Reddick – backing vocals
 Timothy B. Schmit – backing vocals
 Martha Wash – backing vocals

 Ken Komisar – executive producer
 Charlie Watts – engineer
 Steve "Griss" Grissen – engineer
 Bruce Miller – engineer
 Jim "Bonzai" Lyon – engineer
 Ron Gordon – engineer
 Bob Defrin – art direction
 Anthony Ranieri – design
 Jeff Katz – photography
 Yettie – make-up

Credits adapted from the album's liner notes.

Chart performance

Singles

References

External links
[ Nights Like This] at AllMusic

1989 albums
Stacey Q albums
Atlantic Records albums